2 Chronicles 6 is the sixth chapter of the Second Book of Chronicles the Old Testament of the Christian Bible or of the second part of the Books of Chronicles in the Hebrew Bible. The book is compiled from older sources by an unknown person or group, designated by modern scholars as "the Chronicler", and had the final shape established in late fifth or fourth century BCE. This chapter belongs to the section focusing on the kingship of Solomon (2 Chronicles 1 to 9). The focus of this chapter is Solomon's prayer and speech at the consecration of the temple.

Text
This chapter was originally written in the Hebrew language and is divided into 42 verses.

Textual witnesses
Some early manuscripts containing the text of this chapter in Hebrew are of the Masoretic Text, which includes the Aleppo Codex (10th century) and Codex Leningradensis (1008.

There is also a translation into Koine Greek known as the Septuagint, made in the last few centuries BCE. Extant ancient manuscripts of the Septuagint version include Codex Vaticanus (B; B; 4th century), and Codex Alexandrinus (A; A; 5th century).

Old Testament references
: 
:

Solomon blesses the LORD (6:1–11)
The first part of this chapter starts with a doxology, followed by Solomon's speech about God's choice of Jerusalem and David for  the temple's construction, that Davidic promises regarding
them (1 Chronicles 17:1–15) have been fulfilled.

Verse 1
Then Solomon spoke:
"The Lord said He would dwell in the dark cloud."
 Cross reference: 
The Hebrew expression that God 'wished to dwell in darkness' links to God's manifestation on Mount Sinai (Exodus 20:21; Deuteronomy 4:11; 5:22).

Verse 11
The Chronicler sharpens the portrayal of David in relationship with Moses, most significantly in this verse where at three points the Chronicler eliminated or altered allusions to the exodus
themes found in Samuel-Kings (1 Kings 8:21):

Solomon's prayer of dedication (6:12–42)
The second part of the chapter contains a prayer of dedication that consists of seven petitions concerning a variety of predicaments in which Israel may find, including defeat by enemies (verses 24–25), drought (verses 26–27), open pitched battles (verses 34–35) or exile (verses 36–39), in each case of which Solomon asks God to be attentive to the prayers of His people from His heavenly dwelling. 
Verses 32–33 concern with foreigners, whose significance to the people of Israel would be increased in the time between the writing of the books of Kings and that of the books of Chronicles. The theme of Babylonian Exile in 1 Kings 8 had developed into the theme of diaspora (for examples, in Babylon and Egypt) in the Chronicler's time, so the phrase 'and grant them compassion in the sight of their captors, so that they may have compassion on them' in 1 Kings 8:50 is omitted in the Chronicles here, although interestingly it is taken up in the letter written by Hezekiah to the rest of the northern kingdom
(2 Chronicles 30:9). In contrast to 1 Kings 8 the Chronicler omits the reference to the Exodus and therefore to Moses in verse 40 (as in verse 11), but ends in a more positive tone by taking and changing Psalm 132:8–10 to enhance the importance of the ark and the anointed (such as the terms 'salvation' in place of  'righteousness', 'rejoice' in place of 'shout for joy', and goodness).

Verse 13
For Solomon had made a brasen scaffold, of five cubits long, and five cubits broad, and three cubits high, and had set it in the midst of the court: and upon it he stood, and kneeled down upon his knees before all the congregation of Israel, and spread forth his hands toward heaven.
 "Brasen scaffold": or "bronze platform" in NKJV, NIV, NASB, is only found here. The Hebrew word for "scaffold", kîyôr (see 2 Chronicles 4:6), occurs 21 times in KJV and other than here is translated 18 times as "laver", once as "pan" (1 Samuel 2:14), and once as "hearth" (Zechariah 12:6), thus in this verse it evidently means a sort of basin-shaped stand, like a “laver” turned upside down, and most likely hollow underneath (cf. Nehemiah 9:4 for an analogous structure).

See also

Related Bible parts: Exodus 25, Exodus 26, Leviticus 24, Numbers 8, 1 Kings 6, 1 Kings 7, 1 Kings 8, 2 Kings 16, 1 Chronicles 28, Psalm 132

Notes

References

Sources

External links
 Jewish translations:
 Divrei Hayamim II - II Chronicles - Chapter 6 (Judaica Press) in Hebrew and English translation [with Rashi's commentary] at Chabad.org
 Christian translations:
 Online Bible at GospelHall.org (ESV, KJV, Darby, American Standard Version, Bible in Basic English)
 2 Chronicles Chapter 6. Bible Gateway

06